My Friend the Millionaire (German: Mein Freund, der Millionär) is a 1932 German comedy film directed by Hans Behrendt and starring Hermann Thimig, Maria Meissner and Liselotte Schaak. It was shot at the Bavaria Studios in Munich.

Cast
 Hermann Thimig as 	Hans Felix
 Maria Meissner as 	Irene un Kokette
 Liselotte Schaak as 	Eva
 Olga Limburg as 	Mutter
 Jakob Tiedtke as Vater
 Ernst Dumcke as 	Bankier
 Paul Biensfeldt as 	Der Millionär
 Leo Peukert as Prokurist
 Sergius Sax as 	Kurdirector

References

Bibliography 
 Klaus, Ulrich J. Deutsche Tonfilme: Jahrgang 1932. Klaus-Archiv, 1988.

External links 
 

1932 films
Films of the Weimar Republic
German comedy films
1932 comedy films
1930s German-language films
Films directed by Hans Behrendt
Bavaria Film films
German black-and-white films
1930s German films
Films shot at Bavaria Studios